According to late traditions, Saint Clair (Latin: Clarus) was the first bishop of Nantes, France in the late 3rd century.

Traditional account
According to the traditional account, Clair was sent to Nantes by Pope Linus, the successor of St. Peter, seventy years after the birth of Christ. He arrived from Rome, with a nail in his possession from the cross that bore the martyrdom of St. Peter. Then he built an oratory dedicated to the Apostle, which would later become Nantes Cathedral. He died in Kerbellec, village commune Réguiny (Morbihan), and his tomb (emptied since the Norman invasions in late 9th century) lies in a chapel adjoining the church of Réguiny. A votive fountain is also located on the territory of the Breton town.
He is sometimes confused with the fifth century Saint Clair de Albi.

Critique
However, Breton historian Arthur Le Moyne de La Borderie makes the following points:
 -that the ritual of the Church of Nantes, drawn up by precentor Helius in 1263, ignores the apostolic mission of St. Clarus; 
 that St. Peter's nail in the cathedral of Nantes was not brought thither by St. Clarus, but at a time subsequent to the invasions of the Northmen in the tenth century; 
 that St. Felix of Nantes, writing with six other bishops in 567 to St. Radegond, attribute to Martin of Vertou the chief rôle in the conversion of the Nantais to Christianity; and
 that the traditions concerning the mission of St. Clarus are later than 1400.

According to French historian Georges Goyau the earliest list of the bishops of Nantes (made, according to historian Louis Duchesne, at the beginning of the tenth century) does not favour the thesis of a bishop of Nantes prior to Constantine. The dates regarding St. Clarus are uncertain.

Background 
During the mid-seventeenth century, the Estates of Brittany were in frequent conflict with the court in Paris over what they considered infringements on Breton autonomy. In 1636, Dominican Albert Le Grand published Le vies des saints de la Bretagne Armorique. While not necessarily a strong Breton patriot, the Estates saw things otherwise, as, to them, Le Grand's book reinforced the ancient prerogatives of Brittany. However, Le Grand drew a distinction between the seven dioceses founded by British Saints and the more eastern dioceses of Rennes and Nantes, founded by Gallo-Frankish saints.

One year later, Pierre Biré published Concernant l'Origine, Antiquité, Noblesse, & Saincteté de la Bretagne Armorique, & particulerement de ville de Nantes & Renne. In this, Biré said that St. Clair's mission as the first bishop of Nantes and all of Brittany preceded that of St. Denis to France; and it was from Nantes that St. Clair evangelized all of Brittany.

Gallery

References

Bishops of Nantes
3rd-century bishops in Gaul
French beatified people
Beatifications by Pope Pius X